"Day 'n' Nite" is a song by American rapper Kid Cudi. The song was written and produced by Cudi alongside his longtime collaborator and friend, Brooklyn-based producer Dot da Genius. It was issued as Cudi's commercial debut single on February 5, 2008, but had initially been released on Cudi's MySpace page and later featured on several music blogs in November 2007.

The single, which was included on his breakout mixtape A Kid Named Cudi (2008), also serves as the lead single from his debut studio album Man on the Moon: The End of Day (2009). The song has since been certified 5x platinum in the United States. The song peaked at number three on the US Billboard Hot 100. The song was ranked at number 15 on the "Best 25 Songs of 2009" list by Rolling Stone and also ranked at number seven on Complexs "100 Best Songs of The Complex Decade".

Background
As a young man, Cudi moved from his hometown of Cleveland, Ohio, to New York City, to pursue a music career. Upon his arrival, he stayed with his uncle, accomplished drummer Kalil Madi. His uncle later kicked him out, which subsequently led to Cudi writing "Day 'n' Nite": "My uncle that I lived with passed in 2006. We were actually beefing because he forced me out the house when I didn’t have another situation set up, so I was bitter. I never apologized for it, and that kills me. That’s why I wrote "Day 'n' Nite." If he wasn’t there to let me stay with him those first few months, there would be no Kid Cudi. It fucked me up watching him go, but it was like, "I have to fulfill this destiny now for sure." Things were moving but they weren’t solidified yet. I had "Day ’n’ Nite," we were just getting started, and I was like, "This shit has got to pop off." I wasn’t taking no for an answer."

On Cudi's debut album Man on the Moon: The End of Day, the song is listed as "Day 'n' Nite (Nightmare)", following the album's dream sequence. In 2012, in an interview with Complex, Kid Cudi revealed that the 1991 single "Mind Playing Tricks on Me" by the Geto Boys also inspired him to write and record "Day 'n' Nite", saying: "My Mind Playing Tricks On Me is my favorite song in the world. I love it so much I wanted to make my own version of it. And then 'Day 'N' Nite' came out of it."

In January 2014, Cudi announced he had recorded a remix of the song the day after he made the original in 2007. He revealed a snippet of the remix was briefly previewed on the intro of his 2008 breakout mixtape A Kid Named Cudi. The remix was slated to appear on 2014's Satellite Flight: The Journey to Mother Moon, however it failed to make the cut and was ultimately unreleased.

Release
The single was released February 5, 2008, as a digital download. It was released prior to Kid Cudi's signing to the GOOD Music label. The song initially appeared on Cudi's first official project, a mixtape titled A Kid Named Cudi, released in July 2008, in collaboration with New York street-wear brand 10.Deep as a free download. The mixtape caught the attention of Kanye West, whose then-manager Plain Pat, had introduced Cudi's music to him, subsequently leading West to sign Cudi to his GOOD Music imprint later that year.

Crookers remix

"Day 'n' Nite" was remixed by Italian production duo Crookers. The remix was first published as a free download by Fool's Gold Records in March 2008, and released commercially in the United States in August 2008. It was released in the United Kingdom in January 2009 through Data Records, debuting and peaking at number two on the UK Singles Chart for two weeks, behind Lady Gaga's "Just Dance". The remix also charted throughout Europe, reaching the top ten in Belgium, the Netherlands and France. In Australia, the remix and the original charted separately, with the remix reaching number 15 while the original reached number 40. The remix had been selected by BBC Radio 1 Xtra presenter MistaJam as his weekly "Jam Hot" record in April 2008, and was song of the week on Belgian radio station Studio Brussel in December 2008. A video was released without Cudi's permission for this version of the song that Cudi expressed displeasure with. He issued an explanation on his blog and asked that all bloggers remove the video from their blogs. The Crookers remix is often played during his concerts, as a continuation of the original version. At the Beatport Music Awards of 2009, with nominees selected by unit sales on Beatport within 2008, the Crookers remix won the category "Best Indie Dance / Nu Disco Track".

Music videos
There were three music videos filmed for "Day 'n' Nite". The first, a pop art style video, was directed by the French director So Me, who previously worked on music videos with a similar style such as Justice's "D.A.N.C.E." and Kanye West's "Good Life". The pop art music video was produced by Imetrages and also features a brief cameo appearance from Travis Barker. It features Cudi walking around Los Angeles, doing a variety of mundane activities such as getting a slice of pizza, grocery shopping, or visiting a bar, but the overlay of graphic colors on top of the actual video disguises or transforms the daily scene into one of fantasy. These fantasized versions of reality reference the film The Wizard of Oz and later manifest Cudi's desire to perform music; ultimately they play on the song's theme of the "lonely stoner" whose quotidian existence transforms because of his ability to "free his mind." The video features interior and exterior shots of Los Angeles bar, The Smogcutter (located on Virgil) and the somewhat iconic video game arcade, "Family Arcade" (located on Vermont in Hollywood). The music video ranked at number 10 on BET's Notarized: Top 100 Videos of 2009 countdown. It has received over 100 million views on YouTube.

The second version was made specifically for the "Crookers Remix" of the song. It features Cudi as an employee at a typical British corner shop called "Day 'n' Nite", with a reference that he smoked marijuana after his manager left him with the keys. Throughout the video, Cudi has several hallucinations, such as women taking off their clothes, or dancing for him. A minor joke in the beginning is the manager character mispronouncing the name Budi (Cudi's character), a reference to the popular media confusion regarding the pronunciation of "Cudi", as many people pronounced it "Kid Cooty" when he first emerged. Curiously, all products are British and pricing on the shelves is in pounds Sterling but pricing on labels behind the till are in Dollars. The manager also has a British accent while the police woman is in an American police uniform.

The third video that was released (also for The Crookers remix) was actually shot before the others in 2008, by New York directing duo, BBGUN. The video was made before Cudi was signed with Universal Motown on a budget of $250. It was BBGUN's directorial debut and was premiered on Pitchfork on September 9, 2009.

Covers and influence
The song is parodied on American singer "Weird Al" Yankovic's thirteenth album Alpocalypse, in his signature polka medley series, "Polka Face". "Day 'n' Nite" has been covered by American alternative rock band Sugar Ray, live in concert and have recorded their version for RAWsession. The song was also covered by American experimental punk rock band ChainGang. British electropop singer-songwriter Little Boots, recorded her rendition and uploaded it to YouTube. It was also interpolated by American rapper Travis Scott on his track, “Through the Late Night”, which features Cudi. In 2022, British rock band Coldplay covered the song and officially released it through Spotify Singles. Also in 2022, Canadian soul band Chiiild, released a cover of the song exclusively through Amazon Music, as part of their Black History Month rollout.

Formats and track listings

Charts

Weekly charts

Year-end charts

Certifications

Accolades

BET Hip Hop Awards

Beatport Music Awards

MTV Video Music Awards

Grammy Awards

In other media
In 2022, the song was featured in the trailer for American television miniseries Moon Knight.

Release history

References

2007 songs
2008 debut singles
Kid Cudi songs
Song recordings produced by Kid Cudi
Songs written by Kid Cudi
GOOD Music singles
Universal Motown Records singles
Songs written by Dot da Genius
Songs about loneliness
Songs about cannabis
American pop songs
Songs about depression
Songs inspired by deaths